Comedy is a genre of literary works that have happy endings, in contrast to tragedies that have unhappy endings.

Comedy may also refer to:
 Comedy (drama), in the performing arts
 Comedy album
 Comedy film
 Comedy music
 Radio comedy
 Sketch comedy
 Television comedy
 Humour
 Stand-up comedy

Film and television
 Comedy (2002 film), a 2002 animated short film
 The Comedy Network, a Canadian specialty channel

Music
 Comedy (Black album), 1988
 Comedy (Paul Kelly & The Messengers album), 1991
 "Comedy", a 2021 song by Bo Burnham from the special Bo Burnham: Inside
 Comedy, a 2022 single by Gen Hoshino composed for the anime Spy x Family's ending theme for the first season

See also
 The Comedy (disambiguation)
 Comedic genres